Sollitt is an unincorporated community located in Kankakee County, Illinois, United States. It was founded by John Sollitt, who purchased the land from the United States Government in 1853. The town is located off Illinois Route 1 and County Line Road and is north of Grant Park and south of Beecher. Sollitt has fewer than 100 people within the town.

Sollitt Tap is the only business within Sollitt. The tavern, a longstanding destination for motorcycle enthusiasts, celebrated its 40th anniversary in the summer of 2008.

References

External links
 Sollitt, Illinois neighborhood data
 Geography Data

Unincorporated communities in Illinois
Unincorporated communities in Kankakee County, Illinois
Populated places established in 1853